The 106th Infantry Division (German: 106. Infanterie-Division) was a German division in World War II. It was formed on 22 November 1940 in Wahn.
The division was destroyed by the end of August 1944 during the Soviet Jassy–Kishinev Offensive.

Commanding officers
General der Infanterie Ernst Dehner, 28 November 1940 – 3 May 1942
Generalleutnant Alfons Hitter, 3 Mai 1942 – 1 November 1942
Generalleutnant Arthur Kullmer, 1 November 1942 – 1 January 1943
Generalleutnant Werner Forst, 1 January 1943 – 20 February 1944
Generalleutnant Siegfried von Rekowski, 20 February 1944 – August 1944
Oberst Rintenberg,

External links

Infantry divisions of Germany during World War II
Military units and formations established in 1940
Military units and formations disestablished in 1945